Schleswig is an area of southern Jutland, divided between Denmark and Germany, sometimes referred to as Sleswick in English.

Schleswig may also refer to:

Places
 Schleswig, Schleswig-Holstein, a city in Germany
 Schleswig, Iowa, a city in the United States
 Schleswig, Wisconsin, a city in the United States

Regions
 Duchy of Schleswig, a duchy abolished in 1866
Northern Schleswig, the Danish part of Schleswig
 Southern Schleswig, the German part of Schleswig

See also
Schleswig-Holstein, a state of Germany
 Slesvig (disambiguation)